Marine is an adjective meaning of or pertaining to the sea or ocean.

Marine or marines may refer to:

Ocean
 Maritime (disambiguation)
 Marine art
 Marine biology
 Marine debris
 Marine habitats
 Marine life
 Marine pollution

Military 
 Marines, a naval-based infantry force
 United States Marine Corps
 Royal Marines of the UK
 Brazilian Marine Corps
 Spanish Marine Infantry
 Fusiliers marins (France)
 Indonesian Marine Corps
 Republic of China Marine Corps
 Republic of Korea Marine Corps
 Royal Thai Marine Corps
"Marine" also means "navy" in several languages:
 Austro-Hungarian Navy
 Belgian Navy
 Royal Canadian Navy
 Provincial Marine (1796–1910), a predecessor to the Royal Canadian Navy
 Navy of the Democratic Republic of the Congo
 Royal Danish Navy
 Finnish Navy
 French Navy
 Gabonese Navy
 German Navy
 Royal Moroccan Navy
 Royal Netherlands Navy
 Swedish Navy

Places 
 Marines, Val-d'Oise, France
 Marines, Valencia, Spain
 Marine, Illinois, United States
 Marine City, Michigan, United States
 Marine on St. Croix, Minnesota, United States
 Marine, West Virginia, United States
 Marine Drive (disambiguation), the name of several streets in the world

Sports 
 Marine F.C., an English football club from Merseyside
 Marines F.C., a Rwandan football club from Gisenyi
 Chiba Lotte Marines, a Japanese professional baseball team

Other uses
 Marine (given name)
 Marine (book), 1996 book by Tom Clancy
 The Marine, 2006 American film
 Marines (film), 2003 American film
 Merchant marine, or merchant navy, the fleet of merchant vessels registered in a country
 Marine, a Terran basic tier ground unit in the Starcraft series
 Marine the Raccoon, an extra-dimensional character in Sonic Rush Adventure
 "The Marines", episode of Aqua Teen Hunger Force

People with the surname
 David Marine (1888–1976), American pathologist who tested the use of iodide to prevent goiters, which led to the iodization of salt
 Jean-Christophe Marine (born 1968), Belgian molecular biologist
 Joseph E. Marine (1905–1998), New York state senator
 Eulalia Pérez de Guillén Mariné (1766?–1878)
 Jordi Font Mariné (born 1955), Andorran politician
 Oscar Mariné (born 1951), Spanish illustrator, typographer, and artist
 Adriana Marines (1991–1997), Mexican-American murder victim

See also 
 Marin (disambiguation)
 Marina (disambiguation)
 Marine 5 (disambiguation)
 Mariner (disambiguation)
 Marine Sniper
 Marini
 Marino (disambiguation)
 Maritime (disambiguation)
 Marinha de Guerra (disambiguation)
 Space Marine, in science fiction, a soldier who serves aboard a spacecraft or who is trained to fight in space or in planetary attacks
 Submarine